Lachlan Busiko (born 13 January 1998) is a field hockey player from Australia.

Personal life
Lachlan Busiko was born and raised in Naracoorte, South Australia.

He is a current scholarship holder at the South Australian Institute of Sport (SASI).

Career

Junior national team
In 2017, Busiko made his debut for the Australia U–21 side, the 'Burras', at the Sultan of Johor Cup.

Busiko again appeared at the Sultan of Johor Cup in 2018, winning a bronze medal with the team.

In 2019, Busiko was named to the national junior squad for the third time, as well as being named in the team for the 2019 Sultan of Johor Cup.

Adelaide Fire
Following the establishment of the Adelaide Fire in 2019, Lachlan Busiko was presented as the headline player for the men's team. He was also named as team captain for the inaugural tournament of the Sultana Bran Hockey One League, Australia's new premier domestic competition.

References

External links
 
 

1998 births
Living people
Australian male field hockey players
Male field hockey defenders
South Australian Sports Institute alumni